Bright Star School District was a school district headquartered in the Bright Star School in Doddridge, Arkansas.

History
The Miller County district merged into the Bright Star district in 1969.

On July 1, 2004, the Bright Star School District was merged into the Fouke School District.

References

Further reading
 (Download) - Includes maps of predecessor districts

External links
 

Education in Miller County, Arkansas
Defunct school districts in Arkansas
2004 disestablishments in Arkansas
School districts disestablished in 2004